Lilly Marks is an executive at the Anschutz Medical Campus. She has expertise in medical finance. Marks serves on the board of the Federal Reserve Bank of Kansas City Denver Branch.

References

External links
biography at University of Colorado
2013 speech at University of Denver

University of Colorado people
Living people
Year of birth missing (living people)